The 33rd German Skeleton Championship 1999 was organized on 3 January 1999 in Königssee.

Men

Women

External links 
 Resultlist

Skeleton championships in Germany
1999 in German sport
1999 in skeleton